The 1942 Mississippi State Maroons football team represented Mississippi State College during the 1942 college football season.

Schedule

References

Mississippi State
Mississippi State Bulldogs football seasons
Mississippi State Maroons football